No Witch is the third studio album by American band The Cave Singers. It was released in February 2011 under Jagjaguwar.

Track listing

Personnel
 Pete Quirk – vocals, guitar, melodica, harmonica
 Derek Fudesco – guitar, bass pedals
 Marty Lund – drums, guitar

References

External links
 The Cave Singers at Jagjaguwar

2011 albums
Jagjaguwar albums
The Cave Singers albums